Ranakunde is a village in Belgaum district of Karnataka, India.

According to https://villageinfo.in/karnataka/belgaum/belgaum/ranakunde.html: Ranakunde has a population of 1,291 people, with 637 being male and 654 being female.  Ranakunde has about 253 houses.  The nearest village to Ranakunde is Belgaum, which is situated 15 km away.  The pincode of Ranakunde is 590014.  Both Public and Private busing is available within the village, while the nearest railway station is 5–10 km away.

References

Villages in Belagavi district